Whale Mountain is a , summit in the northwestern Cuyamaca Mountains in San Diego County, California. It is located between Ramona and Santa Ysabel, near Ballena Valley. 

Ballena takes its name from the mountain, ballena being Spanish for "whale". The Spanish name was the equivalent of the Ipai word  which also means "whale", and which was their name for the mountain.

Whale Mountain is known for being desert-like and containing many desert plants and animals, such as cacti.

References

Mountains of San Diego County, California
Cuyamaca Mountains
Mountains of Southern California
Whales and humans